The Copa America is an Indoor soccer tournament organised by the Professional Arena Soccer League. As well as teams from the PASL, the competition is also open to teams from the Canadian Major Indoor Soccer League and the Major Indoor Soccer League.

Champions

References

 
Soccer cup competitions in the United States
Professional Arena Soccer League